The Everett Silvertips are an American major junior ice hockey team currently members of the U.S. Division in the Western Conference of the Western Hockey League (WHL). The team is based in Everett, Washington, and joined the WHL as an expansion team for the 2003–04 season. The team name comes from the silvertip bear. The team plays at Angel of the Winds Arena, a $71.5 million multipurpose complex built in 2003 that seats 8,300 (or 8,513 with standing room only seats included) for hockey. The team's mascot is Lincoln, a silvertip bear, named after the aircraft carrier  stationed at the time at Naval Station Everett.

Notable NHL alumni from the team include Ryan Murray, Radko Gudas, Nikita Scherbak, Noah Juulsen, Byron Froese, Jujhar Khaira, Mirco Mueller, Zach Hamill and Carter Hart. Throughout their history, the team has developed heated rivalries with the Seattle Thunderbirds and Portland Winterhawks.

History

The city of Everett, Washington, was awarded conditional approval for an expansion franchise from the Western Hockey League on September 18, 2001. The team, to begin play in the 2003–04 season at a new arena in downtown Everett, would be named the "Silvertips" after the grizzly bears of the Pacific Northwest.

Inaugural season: 2003–04
During the Silvertips' inaugural season in the U.S. Division of the WHL, the team solidified its place as one of the most successful expansion hockey teams in history after breaking a minimum of ten junior hockey records for an expansion team in its first year. Under the direction of general manager Doug Soetaert and head coach Kevin Constantine, the team won the U.S. Division title with a record of 35–27–8–2, while setting a record for a first-year team in any of the major junior hockey leagues in the Canadian Hockey League (the OHL, QMJHL and WHL) by earning 80 points in the regular season standings, eclipsing the old record set by the 1982–83 Longueuil Chevaliers of the QMJHL. Constantine received the Dunc McCallum Memorial Trophy from the WHL as the 2003–04 Coach of the Year.

In the 2004 playoffs, the Silvertips swept the Spokane Chiefs 4–0 in the first round before defeating the Vancouver Giants 4–2 in the Western Conference semifinals. The team then played the Kelowna Rockets, the regular season champions and reigning WHL champions, for the Western Conference title. After falling behind in the series three games to one, the Silvertips improbably won three-straight games in overtime to win its first Western Conference title, earning the chance to play the Medicine Hat Tigers for the WHL championship. The Tigers, however, swept the series in four-straight games, marking an end to the Silvertips' first season.

2004–05 season
Fresh off the success of its successful inaugural season, the 2004–05 Silvertips team was the youngest in the League. At one time, the team had a minimum of eight 16-year-old rookies on the active game-day roster. With such youth and inexperience, the team was projected to falter, but still managed to make the playoffs for a second consecutive season. After defeating the Portland Winter Hawks in seven games during a first round playoff series, the Silvertips finished their second season in the WHL by being swept by Kootenay 4–0 in the Western Conference Semifinals.

2005–06 season
The 2005–06 season marked the second time the team had won the U.S. Division title, in only its third season of existence. After defeating the Tri-City Americans 4–1 in the first round of the WHL playoffs, and the Kelowna Rockets 4–2 in the Western Conference semifinals, the Silvertips' playoff run came to an end when the Silvertips were swept by Vancouver 4–0 in the Western Conference Finals. However, the Silvertips once again exceeded expectations by reaching the final four of the WHL playoffs for the second time in three seasons.

Silvertips' forward Peter Mueller won the Jim Piggott Memorial Trophy for top rookie in the League, becoming to the first Silvertips player to win the award.

2006–07 season
The 2006–07 regular season was the team's most successful to date. Everett entered the season as the pre-season number one team in the CHL "Top Ten" rankings. The team remained on the CHL "Top Ten" rankings list the entire regular season, being selected first overall for 13 of the 25 weeks the rankings were selected, never falling lower than fifth. Led by captain Jason Fransoo, the 'Tips clinched a playoff berth a mere 48 games into the season and captured its third U.S. Division title in only four years of existence. The team was also awarded the Scotty Munro Memorial Trophy for having the best record in the WHL during the regular season, posting a record of 54–15–1–2 (111 points).

Silvertips forward Zach Hamill became the first Everett Silvertip to lead the WHL in points with 32 goals and 61 assists for 93 points, winning the Bob Clarke Trophy. Silvertips forward Kyle Beach won the Jim Piggott Memorial Trophy for top rookie in the League. Peter Mueller continued to provide plenty of offensive production, along with forwards Moises Gutierrez, Ondrej Fiala and Dan Gendur. The Silvertips also received strong play from the grinding "Joe" Line of Brennan Sonne, Damir Alic and Jesse Smyke.

It was a controversial season for Everett, beginning after a preseason loss in Tri-City. Coach Constantine was unhappy with the team's performance and made the players ride the bus back from Kennewick to Everett in their full hockey gear without a post-game meal. Constantine was fined and suspended by the WHL for his actions, although he claimed to have attended at least one home game by purchasing a ticket and watching from the stands. The team had several line brawls throughout the season, including a memorable fight with the Vancouver Giants. Late in the season, the Silvertips were fined by the League after an altercation involving fans and the Portland Winter Hawks' bench.

After defeating the Spokane Chiefs 4–2 in the first round of the WHL playoffs, the Silvertips' playoff run came to an abrupt end when the Prince George Cougars defeated the Silvertips 4–2 during the Western Conference semifinals after the Silvertips led the series 2–0.

2007–08 season
The 2007–08 season began a transition period for the franchise. Constantine left during the preceding off-season to become head coach of the Houston Aeros in the American Hockey League (AHL). Assistant head coach John Becanic was promoted to head coach, with Jay Varady promoted to Becanic's former position. Six of the team's ten leading scorers from the 2006–07 season, as well as the backup goaltender, left the team early in the season, mostly through trades and graduation from the WHL. These departures included Peter Mueller, who joined the Phoenix Coyotes in the National Hockey League (NHL) for the remainder or the season. The transition from Constantine's defensive-centred coaching style to Becanic's coaching style for the returning players, and the team struggled at times during the season.

The Silvertips ended the regular season fourth in the U.S. Division and sixth in the Western Conference. The team was swept by the Spokane Chiefs, the eventual Memorial Cup champions, 4–0 in the first round of the playoffs. This marked the first time the Silvertips lost in the first round of the WHL playoffs, but kept alive the team's ominous history of losing four-straight games to be ousted from a playoff round.

2008–09 season
The 2008–09 season was one that began with low expectations. NHL-drafted players such as Zach Hamill, Leland Irving, and Dan Gendur, as well as 2007–08 team captain Jonathan Harty, left the team. Finding sufficient scoring, defence and goaltending was in doubt. Overage defencemen Graham Potuer and Taylor Ellington were the only remaining players from the team's impressive crop of players taken in the 1988-born WHL Bantam Draft that had marked the team's success during the previous three seasons. The team had its youngest roster in franchise history.

Fortunately, just as rookies helped salvage the franchise's 2004–05 season, rookies helped salvage a potentially disastrous 2008–09 season. The most successful example of this might be the emergence of rookie forwards Kellan Tochkin, Byron Froese and Tyler Maxwell, nicknamed the "Kid Line." The three players combined for 177 points, making it one of the most successful rookie lines in WHL history. The trio was led by Tochkin, whose 74 points in 72 games led the team, as well as all WHL rookies, in scoring. In addition to the "Kid Line," rookie 16-year old goaltender Kent Simpson also exceeded expectations, and was later assisted by acquired goaltender Thomas Heemskerk.

The team record was above .500 for the first half of the season, but the roster's young and inexperience caught up in the second half of the season. The team ended its regular season with a 27–36–7–2 record, the first losing record in the franchise's history. However, if the emergence and success of the team's rookies had not occurred, the team's record would have likely been much worse.

The Silvertips ended the regular season fourth in the U.S. Division and seventh in the Western Conference. The team lost to the Tri-City Americans, the two-time U.S. Division Champions, 4–1 in the first round of the playoffs. This marked the first time the Silvertips had been ousted from the playoffs without losing four-straight games.

Shortly after the 2008–09 season ended, head coach John Becanic was fired. Several months later, general manager Doug Soetaert announced the hiring of former NHL and Ontario Hockey League (OHL) coach Craig Hartsburg as the team's new head coach, marking the beginning of a new era for the franchise.

2009–10 season
The 2009–10 season began slowly for Everett. After much inconsistency early on, the emergence of the "DHL" line of captain Zack Dailey, leading scorer Shane Harper, and overage acquisition Chris Langkow, along with the top defensive pairing of rookie sensation Ryan Murray and import Radko Gudas, led to a team-record 14 consecutive wins during the month of January. The "Kid Line" from the previous year continued to improve and the trio of Daniel Iwanski, Clayton Cumiskey and Scott MacDonald provided depth as a solid checking line. The team also benefited from having the top goaltending tandem in the WHL in Thomas Heemskerk and Kent Simpson. Harper finished the year as the club's career goal leader with his 100th WHL goal.

The second-half hot streak led to the Silvertips tying Tri-City for the top record in the Western Conference, with a chance to beat out the Americans in the season's final game at the Spokane Chiefs. However, the Chiefs beat the 'Tips 3–2, dropping Everett to the third seed to face-off against the defending WHL champion Kelowna Rockets. The bigger and more physical Rockets wore down the 'Tips throughout the seven-game series, with Gudas missing several games due to injury. Kelowna held off Everett in double-overtime in Game 6, and finished the upset with a 2–1 win in Game 7, bringing a disappointing end to a surprising season for the Silvertips.

2010–11 season
The 2010–11 Silvertips entered the season with high expectations following the previous season's strong second half, and with the acquisition of new captain Landon Ferraro from the Red Deer Rebels in exchange for Byron Froese. Everett also acquired centre Parker Stanfield from the Prince George Cougars and defencemen Brennan Yadlowski and Chad Suer from the Lethbridge Hurricanes and Moose Jaw Warriors, respectively. Josh Birkholz and Cody Fowlie contributed as newcoming forwards.

However, the team never gelled and was beset by a myriad of injuries all season long. Head coach Craig Hartsburg missed most of the first half of the season following heart surgery and was replaced on an interim basis by associate coach Jay Varady. One of the few bright spots was left winger Tyler Maxwell breaking the club record with 41 goals in the season. The team generally underachieved throughout the season amidst dwindling fan attendance, and barely sneaked into the playoffs as the eighth seed in the Western Conference. The Silvertips then were no match for the Portland Winterhawks, and were swept out of the first round. After the 2010–11 season, Hartsburg stepped down from the coaching position to pursue a coaching career with the NHL's Calgary Flames, as the team set about rebuilding for the first time in their short history.

2011–12 season
Prior to the 2011–12 season, Mark Ferner was hired by general manager Doug Soetart to be Everett's head coach following four successive years as the head coach of the British Columbia Hockey League (BCHL)'s Vernon Vipers. The team began somewhat of a youth movement by parting with several veterans. Former NCAA player Josh Birkholz led the team in scoring, forward Ryan Harrison provided toughness and leadership and defenseman Ryan Murray continued his remarkable development by being named the youngest team captain in Silvertips history. Murray was selected second overall in the 2012 NHL Entry Draft by the Columbus Blue Jackets following the season. Eighteen-year-old forwards Joshua Winquist and Manraj Hayer showed some scoring touch, and enforcers Josh Caron and Reid Petryk were acquired to help protect the youngsters. Goaltender Kent Simpson was being pushed for playing time by impressive rookie Austin Lotz.

The team struggled throughout the first half, however, winning only five games through the end of December and bottoming out with a ten-game losing streak. General manager Doug Soetart was fired on February 2, 2012, and later sued the team for unpaid wages. Soetart was eventually replaced by Portland Winterhawks assistant general manager Garry Davidson. However, the team improved in the second half, led by strong goaltending from Kent Simpson and the top-scoring line of Harrison, rookie Kohl Bauml and Fowlie. After a late-season hot streak, Everett found itself in position to clinch a playoff berth in the final game of the season, on the road against the Seattle Thunderbirds. A hard-fought 6–4 victory in Kent by the Silvertips set up a first-round playoff matchup against the top-seeded Tri-City Americans. The young 'Tips fought mightily, but were overmatched by the much stronger Tri-City team, culminating in a sweep after a heartbreaking 4–3 overtime loss in Game 4.

2012–13 season
The Silvertips opened their tenth season with a very young roster that included 16-year-old forwards Ty Mappin, Dawson Leedahl and highly elite Tyler Sandhu, along with 17-year-old Carson Stadnyk, playing key roles. Captain Ryan Murray was lost for the season with a shoulder injury, and Swiss rookie Mirco Mueller emerged as the team's top defenceman. Goaltender Austin Lotz struggled early and had to battle for playing time with early-season pickup Daniel Cotton. Midway through the season, head coach Mark Ferner and assistant coach Chris Hartsburg were fired, and general manager Garry Davidson assumed the head coach position on an interim basis for the remainder of the season. Injuries to several of the veteran forwards contributed to an up-and-down season, again leaving Everett in eighth place in the final Conference standings.

In the playoffs, the Silvertips found themselves facing the Portland Winterhawks, who were the top seed in the West and who had spent the entire season at or near the top of the CHL rankings. The Winterhawks were almost universally expected to sweep the series against the Silvertips with little effort; however, the Silvertips defied all expectations by winning two games in Portland before falling four games to two. While the series loss continued Everett's streak of being eliminated from the playoffs in the first round, in qualifying for post-season play the team maintained its streak of appearing in the playoffs in every year of its existence.

2013–14 season
The Silvertips set out to improve upon the previous years' mediocrity, along with increasing fan frustration, by guaranteeing a sixth-place or better finish in the Western Conference standings. With Joshua Winquist, Manny Hayer, and Juhjar Khaira leading a veteran, but top-heavy, forward corps, and a revamped defence headed by new captain Matt Pufahl, the 'Tips stormed out of the gate with a 20–4–4 start. The early-season highlight was a 3–2 win over the League powerhouse Portland Winterhawks. Everett had the best record in the WHL entering the month of December, when several incidents of player misconduct at a concert and subsequent team event derailed a promising season. The team struggled immensely for the next two months, culminating in two players getting kicked off of the team.

Eventually, the 'Tips emerged back on track and stormed down the stretch with big wins over the Kelowna Rockets and in Spokane against the Chiefs, breaking a long losing streak in Spokane Arena. A big factor late in the season was the line of Brayden Low, Remi Laurencelle, and Logan Aasman dominating possession of the puck while on the ice. Everett reached the playoffs where they faced the rival Seattle Thunderbirds. They were even favoured by many pundits in the series, albeit as the lower-seeded team. However, Seattle played an extremely physical series and wore the 'Tips down. Everett eventually lost the series four games to one, with the only win coming while Seattle enforcer Jaimien Yakubowski was suspended for Game 4.

2014–15 season
Everett once again benefited from a strong start to the year, and led the U.S. Division for the majority of the season. Carter Hart was pressed into starting in goal, and shined in a 1-0 opening game win in Kent against the Thunderbirds. Import Nikita Scherbak was acquired from the Saskatoon Blades and led the team in scoring, while playing on a line with Remi Laurencelle and Brayden Low. The "Saskatoon Platoon" of Kohl Bauml, Carson Stadnyk and Dawson Leedahl provided strong play. The defense was led by youngsters Kevin Davis and Noah Juulsen. After holding off the Portland Winterhawks to win the division title, the Tips faced the Spokane Chiefs in the first round of the playoffs. A back-and-forth series that saw 4 multiple overtime games was eventually won by Everett in Game 6. After beating Portland in the first game of the second round, the Hawks stormed back to win the next four games.

2015–16 season
Despite only scoring 182 goals for the entire season, the Everett Silvertips defied the odds by maintaining a lead in the U.S. Division for the majority of the season, before being overtaken by the Seattle Thunderbirds in early March. Remi Laurencelle led the team in scoring with only 58 points, but Carter Hart went on to become CHL Goaltender of the Year. After sweeping Portland in the first round of the playoffs, the Tips once again gained a 1–0 series lead in the second round, this time to Seattle, before losing the next four. Following the season, Auston Matthews and Tyson Jost, both Everett listed players who did not sign with the team, were drafted in the Top 10 of the 2016 NHL Draft.

2016–17 season

Carter Hart led Everett to its fifth U.S. Division title, while once again winning the Goaltender of the Year award. The "Scrabble Line" of Dominic Zwerger, Matt Fonteyne, and Patrick Bajkov provided most of the scoring, and captain Noah Juulsen anchored the defense. A hard-fought first round series against the Victoria Royals was won when fourth-liner Cal Babych scored in the fifth overtime of game six, which was the longest game in junior hockey history. However, the eventual league champion Seattle Thunderbirds swept the Silvertips in the second round and coach Kevin Constantine was relieved of his duties.

Season-by-season record
Note: GP = Games played, W = Wins, L = Losses, T = Ties, OTL = Overtime losses, SOL = Shootout losses, Pts = Points, GF = Goals for, GA = Goals against

WHL Championship history
2003–04: Loss, 0–4 vs Medicine Hat
2017–18: Loss, 2-4 vs Swift Current
 WHL Championship overall record: 2 - 8

Current roster
Updated January 24, 2023.

 

 
 

 

 

 
 
 
 
 

 

 

 

|}

NHL draftees

NHL alumni
List of NHL alumni.

 Riley Armstrong
 Ivan Baranka
 Jake Christiansen
 Connor Dewar
 Landon Ferraro
 Byron Froese
 Radko Gudas
 Zach Hamill
 Shane Harper
 Carter Hart
 Shaun Heshka
 Leland Irving
 Noah Juulsen
 Jujhar Khaira
 Bryce Kindopp
 Mirco Mueller
 Peter Mueller
 Ryan Murray
 Garrett Pilon
 Rasmus Rissanen
 Nikita Scherbak
 Kent Simpson
 Mike Wall

Honors
Western Hockey League
Ed Chynoweth Cup
Runners-up (2): 2003–04, 2017–18
Scotty Munro Memorial Trophy
Winners (1): 2006–07
Western Conference
Winners (2): 2003–04, 2017–18, 2021–22
U.S. Division
Winners (9): 2003–04, 2005–06, 2006–07, 2014–15, 2016–17, 2017–18, 2018–19, 2020–21, 2021–22

Individual Awards
Four Broncos Memorial Trophy
Carter Hart: 2017–18
Bob Clarke Trophy (Top scorer)
Zach Hamill: 2006–07
Daryl K. (Doc) Seaman Trophy (Scholastic player of the year)
Brian King: 2016–17
Dustin Wolf: 2018–19
Del Wilson Trophy (Goaltender of the year)
Carter Hart: 2015–16, 2016-17, 2017–18
Dustin Wolf: 2019–20, 2020–21
Jim Piggott Memorial Trophy (Rookie of the year)
Peter Mueller: 2005–06
Kyle Beach: 2006–07
Dunc McCallum Memorial Trophy (Coach of the year)
Kevin Constantine: 2003–04

Notes

External links

2003 establishments in Washington (state)
Ice hockey teams in Washington (state)
Ice hockey clubs established in 2003
Sports in Everett, Washington
Western Hockey League teams